Robert Lang (5 August 1917 – 16 August 1997) was a Swiss racing cyclist. He rode in the 1947 Tour de France.

References

External links
 

1917 births
1997 deaths
Swiss male cyclists
People from Lavaux-Oron District
Sportspeople from the canton of Vaud
Tour de Suisse stage winners